Emily Grierson is a fictional character in the short story "A Rose for Emily" by William Faulkner.

Grierson is a spinster living alone in Faulkner's fictional Jefferson, Mississippi with an overbearing father. The townspeople feel sympathy for her after her father's death and try to help her cope with life alone.  However, they underestimate Grierson's zealous need for her father and Homer and the measures she was willing to take to keep them with her.

Character
Miss Emily is seen as a “hereditary obligation upon the town” in which she lived. The townspeople find themselves ostensibly looking after her following her father's death. She is often misunderstood as she is portrayed as incapable of being alone while also exhibiting a sense of authority over the town by disregarding the laws of which they live by -- not paying her taxes, not putting numbers on her mailbox for the federal mail service, refusing to disclose a reason to the druggist for her purchase of arsenic, and parading around town with Homer Barron.

As new town leaders take over, they make unsuccessful attempts to get Emily to resume payments. When members of the Board of Aldermen pay her a visit, in the dusty and antiquated parlor, Emily reasserts the fact that she is not required to pay taxes in Jefferson and that the officials should talk to Colonel Sartoris about the matter. However, at that point he has been dead for almost a decade. She asks the family retainer, her black servant Tobe, to show the men out.
               
After purchasing the arsenic, some townspeople thought she was going to kill herself, but, misunderstood as always, she had other plans. Her
physical appearance also displays her true inner character. Her actions cause readers to view her cautiously and apprehensively as a result of her increasingly radical behavior. Readers will find themselves sympathetic towards Miss Emily in the beginning but far less so, if at all, by the end of the story due to her disturbing actions and obdurate character.

Miss Emily's character symbolizes the fall of the chivalric American South as the industrial, modern South begins to rise. The description of the decay of both herself and the house slowing becoming "decaying eyesores" add to the imagery of things associated with Miss Emily.  The town is evolving but Emily obdurately refused to change. Later in life, she is described as “bloated, like a body long submerged in motionless water…her eyes, lost in the fatty ridges of her face, looked like two small pieces of coal pressed into a lump of dough”. The reoccurring reminder that Miss Emily is stuck in the past symbolizes a South not ready to embrace industrialization and fully let go of its bygone antebellum past.

Mr. Grierson  
Emily had a father who sought to stifle and control her with rules, regulations, and demands. This was apparent when Miss Emily was “thirty and … still single.” He believed that no one in town was good enough for his daughter and that she had to be protected from dishonor and those beneath her. The town “had long thought of them as a tableau, Miss Emily a slender figure in white in the background, her father a spraddled silhouette in the foreground, his back to her clutching a horsewhip.” Despite Mr. Grierson ruling a huge aspect of Emily's life, it was clear that Miss Emily truly loved and cared for him when he died. “The day after his death all the ladies prepared to call at the house … as is … custom Miss Emily met them at the door, dressed as usual … with no trace of grief on her face. She told them that her father was not dead.” She proceeded to do this for three days until “she broke down, and they buried her father quickly.” This passion and love for her father contributed to the impact that loss had on her heart in the future.

Grierson Home
Emily lives in Jefferson, Mississippi. Her home "was a big, squarish frame house", and she did not have to pay taxes on it. Colonel Sartoris' decided to allow her to be waived from taxes after the death of her father, a situation she regarded as permanent. The home was described as one "that had once been white, decorated with cupolas and spires and scrolled balconies in the heavily lightsome style of the seventies.” As the town began to modernize, "only Miss Emily’s house was left, lifting its stubborn and coquettish decay above the cotton wagons and the gasoline pumps -- an eyesore among eyesores." The house "smelled of dust and disuse—a close, dank smell", and "furnished in heavy, leather-covered furniture". As the people in the community move around her house, “a faint dust rose sluggishly about their thighs, spinning with slow motes in the single sun-ray.”

At one point, the townspeople also complained of a mysterious odor coming from her house. They later on find that this odor was coming from the corpse of Homer Barron, decaying in the house. This home held the body of Homer in a room that was locked up for several years, which was not discovered until the death of Miss Emily, when people began to look through her home.

Tragedies

Death of Her Father 
Many people found that when Miss Emily's father died, “at last they could pity Miss Emily.” “Being left alone, and a pauper”, she was now completely alone.  She feared being alone because her father who was once always there was no longer and she didn't have a companion to fall back on after “all the young men her father had driven away.”

Homer Barron 
In that room, the longest kept secret, and the biggest surprise was then found: “The man himself lay in the bed.” The greatest shock, however, came not from the rotting body but from what they saw next to this decaying corpse. The people in Miss Emily's house “noticed that in the second pillow was the indentation of a head.” After looking closely they then found “a long strand of iron-gray hair.” Miss Emily had loved this man, and loved having him in her life. In order to keep him permanently around, she bought poison from a druggist. Many of the people in the community assumed that this poison would be for Miss Emily to kill herself. The community then realized, after coming upon this secret, that this poison was to keep Homer in Miss Emily's life. One writer, Gary Kriewald, notes that Miss Emily's "strategic retreat into the sanctuary of her house after Homer Barron's 'desertion' of her is as defiant as it is self-protective, an act of passive resistance directed against a society."

Analysis 
Emily's life was spent mostly in isolation, not only physically but emotionally. Her father's strict, authoritarian parenting style did not let her socialize to meet friends or possible love interests. Once her father died, Emily felt the loneliest she was in her life, as he was all she had. 

It is evident that Emily suffered psychological trauma from her relationship with her father, which suggests why she acted the way she did later on in her life, keeping the body of her fiancé after he died. It is implied that she suffered from necrophilia as she felt so connected still to Homer; enough to keep his dead body in her home from his death until hers many years later and a strand of her hair is discovered next to his corpse. She wanted to be happy with Homer for the rest of her life, could not handle the rejection, so she killed him with poison, and kept his body in her home. Her refusal to give up her father's body for days after his death, then keeping Homer's for years suggests that she was too stubborn to let go and believed she could still have a connection with them even after their deaths.

Notes

References

William Faulkner characters
Literary characters introduced in 1930
Fictional hermits
Fiction about necrophilia
Fictional murderers